Louis Charles Latham (September 11, 1840, Plymouth, North Carolina – October 16, 1895 Baltimore, Maryland) was a member of the United States House of Representatives representing North Carolina.

Biography
Latham graduated from the University of North Carolina at Chapel Hill in 1859 and  later attended the Harvard Law School. He entered the Confederate Army in 1861 where he was commissioned captain and afterward major of the First Regiment of North Carolina State troops, and served throughout the American Civil War. Following  the war he resumed the study of law, was admitted to the bar in 1868 and commenced practice in Plymouth, N.C.

He was elected member of the North Carolina House of Commons in 1864 and to the North Carolina State Senate in 1870. He was elected as a Democrat to the Forty-seventh Congress (March 4, 1881 – March 3, 1883); unsuccessful candidate for renomination in 1882; elected to the Fiftieth Congress (March 4, 1887 – March 3, 1889); unsuccessful candidate for reelection in 1888 to the Fifty-first United States Congress.

He resumed the practice of law in Greenville, North Carolina and died at Johns Hopkins University Hospital in Baltimore, Maryland on October 16, 1895. He was interred in Greenville's City Cemetery.

References

 
Jerome Dowd, Sketches of Prominent Living North Carolinians, 1888, page 53
Thomas William Herringshaw, Herringshaw's Encyclopedia of American Biography of the Nineteenth Century, 1904, page 572

1840 births
1895 deaths
People from Plymouth, North Carolina
People from Greenville, North Carolina
Confederate States Army officers
University of North Carolina at Chapel Hill alumni
Harvard Law School alumni
North Carolina lawyers
Democratic Party members of the North Carolina House of Representatives
Democratic Party North Carolina state senators
Democratic Party members of the United States House of Representatives from North Carolina
19th-century American politicians
19th-century American lawyers